The Martin Canyon Beds is a geologic formation in Colorado. It preserves fossils dating back to the Neogene period.

See also

 List of fossiliferous stratigraphic units in Colorado
 Paleontology in Colorado

References
 

Geologic formations of Colorado
Neogene stratigraphic units of North America